The Corrientes campaign or the Paraguayan invasion of Corrientes was the second campaign of the Paraguayan War. During the campaign, Paraguayan forces occupied the Argentinian city of Corrientes and other towns in the province of the same name. The campaign occurred simultaneously with the Siege of Uruguaiana.

Due to the invasion, Argentina and Uruguay declared war against Paraguay, which was already at war with the Empire of Brazil, and signed the Treaty of the Triple Alliance. The Paraguayan invasion of Argentina eventually failed but opened a path for the invasion of Paraguay itself in later campaigns.

Background

Military situation

In the early 1860s, liberalism spread to Argentina and Uruguay, culminating in the coming to power in both countries and in both cases through civil war, of liberal political and military leaders in government. In Argentina, General Bartolomé Mitre assumed the presidency in 1862 and helped General Venancio Flores to come to power in Uruguay in 1865. Mitre and Flores had been allies of the Empire of Brazil long before, as the Uruguayan president was only able to reach the presidency with the help of the Brazilians in the Uruguayan War.

Faced with this advance of the liberal forces and the influence of the Empire, the Paraguayan government of Marshal Francisco Solano López, a conservative, anticipated that Brazil and Argentina would then attempt an attack and try to establish liberalism in Paraguay through civil war. On the other hand, López had certain aspirations to influence the policies of the other countries in the Río de la Plata basin.

The invasion of Uruguay by Flores, and the support received by his two neighbors, motivated López to demand the withdrawal of foreign forces, and the Uruguayan government asked López for help. But his strategy in relation to Uruguay was inconsistent; he favored strategy and resolution of border conflicts with Brazil to the north, to coming to the aid of the Uruguayan government as soon as possible. On 11 November 1864, the Mato Grosso Campaign began, the first phase of the Paraguayan War.

The Paraguayan invasion of Mato Grosso was a complete success. The Blanco Government in Uruguay was defeated, and General Flores assumed the presidency.

López then asked Argentinian President Bartolomé Mitre to allow his troops to cross Corrientes Province towards the Uruguay River, both to restart the civil war in Uruguay, and to attack the Brazilian province of Rio Grande do Sul. The argument López made to Mitre was that Argentina was neutral in the conflict between Paraguay and Brazil, just as he had been between the contending sides in the Uruguayan Civil War, and that, since he had allowed Uruguayan rebel troops and the Brazilian navy to cross Argentine territory and jurisdictional waters, López could expect the same authorization for Paraguayan troops going to Brazil or Uruguay. Mitre flatly denied permission, however, arguing that neutrality forced him to not allow the passage of troops through his territory. This refusal triggered the declaration of war by López against the Mitre government and the subsequent Paraguayan invasion of Corrientes.

Plans

The Paraguayan success in the invasion of Mato Grosso allowed them to occupy various places, some in dispute with Brazil. However this territory had little to no communication with the rest of Brazil, so Paraguayan troops couldn't continue to advance into enemy territory to force Brazil to surrender or negotiate. If Paraguay wanted to achieve any results in Uruguay, or weaken its army to prevent further attacks on Paraguayan territory, it had to continue the war on another front. The inevitable choice was the province of Rio Grande do Sul across the territory of Corrientes Province.

Before Mitre's refusal, López had planned to concentrate his forces along the Uruguay River to directly attack Brazil or to enter Uruguayan territory. But once war was declared on Argentina, he needed to prevent the Argentine Army from hindering the Paraguayan advance, by carrying out a diversionary maneuver while the advance was made along the Uruguay River. The objective was to occupy the city of Corrientes, a strategy that would also make it possible to control the upper Paraná River, leaving communications open through Corrientes Province.

At some point between the decision to invade and the advance of the troops, López decided to use the troops occupying the capital of the invaded province to support the advance on the Uruguay River. So, instead of concentrating most of the troops in this last column, he formed this army with only about 12,000 men, and sent 25,000 soldiers to the Paraná River.

Before initiating his plan, López sent Lieutenant Cipriano Ayala to deliver the declaration of war to Buenos Aires. War was officially declared on 18 March 1865, and was published in Asunción a week later. Given the long journey this officer had to make, the attack would be launched after the expected date of delivery of the declaration of war but before the news arrived back in Paraguayan territory, to prevent the Argentine army, particularly disorganized and underequipped, from having time to react.

But the mission of the messenger carrying the declaration of war had many complications, so the Argentine public learned of the invasion of Corrientes first, before they learned of the declaration of war. Mitre was able to use this public misinformation to inflame public opinion and exact revenge for the supposed Paraguayan outrage of having attacked without previously declaring war.

Occupation of Corrientes

At dawn on 13 April 1865, a squadron of five Paraguayan-flagged steamboats appeared before the city of Corrientes, with a landing party of 2,500 under the command of Commander Pedro Ignacio Meza.

They passed the city in a southerly direction, then turned north again and attacked the Gualeguay and the 25 de Mayo, Argentine steamers in port for repairs. The 25 de Mayo had a crew of 80 men and its battery was still assembled, but the Gualeguay was on land, unarmed, with only one guard under the command of Second Lieutenant Ceferino Ramírez. The crews of two Paraguayan ships boarded the Argentine ships, and after a skirmish that cost some casualties, captured them. The next day, some 3,500 to 4,000 men landed and occupied the city.

After the attack, some residents led by  constructed a defense from the roofs of the houses closest to the port. After the attacking fleet withdrew, some tried to organize battalions, for which volunteers were summoned to the Plaza 25 de Mayo and Plaza del Mercado, under Colonel Solano González. Although it was consigned to form some groups, they finally decided to reorganize themselves through a withdrawal in the departments of the provincial interior.

In the fleet, they embarked as many soldiers as they could and, at dawn on 14 April, the small Paraguayan squadron moored again in the port of Corrientes, taking possession of the city square without any resistance. Shortly afterwards, the column from Paso de la Patria arrived under the command of General Robles, and the rest of the invading forces. The Argentine ships 25 de Mayo and Gualeguay did not return to the port of Corrientes, since they had been incorporated into the Paraguayan Navy and were sent to Asunción for repairs.

The Argentine authorities withdrew, along with the few military battalions, which had no chance to resist the invading Paraguayan forces. Withdrawing to the interior was the only option left for them to reorganize under the orders of Nicanor Cáceres, who constantly harassed the invaders and kept the troops loyal to Governor Lagraña.

Corrientes reacted in two different ways. Some residents fled to rural areas, away from the city to country houses in Lomas, while others crossed the Paraná, and took refuge in the interior of the Chaco Territory. The rest, a significant fraction of the population, neither opposed nor resisted the Paraguayan troops. In fact, a chronicler of the time recorded that the inhabitants of the city were not hostile to the invaders, a reason that made it easier for them to receive good treatment, unlike the abusive treatment carried out in other occupied territories.

In principle, Paraguayan control of the square was irreversible, so Governor Lagraña and his closest collaborators, as well as some security groups, moved to rural areas to avoid being taken prisoner. But before he withdrew, Lagraña ruled that every citizen of Corrientes between sixteen and seventy years old was required to enlist to fight the occupation forces.

The Paraguayan troops, commanded by General Wenceslao Robles, took control of the city as Lagraña left it in the hands of a few soldiers from the government house guard.

In the afternoon, a column of 800 cavalrymen arrived by land and entered the city, and Robles met with a popular assembly, apparently made up exclusively of members of the Federalist Party and other opponents of the national government, which was held by supporters of the unitary party. A provisional government was formed by Teodoro Gauna,  and Sinforoso Cáceres. In practice, local political action was carried out by Cáceres, while in regard to commercial matters and relations with Paraguay, the triumvirate was limited to endorsing the actions of the Paraguayan commissioners José Berges, Miguel Haedo and Juan Bautista Urdapilleta.

Initially, the leaders of the Federalist Party in the capital supported the Paraguayan occupation as allies in their attempt to recover the political dominance they had lost at the end of 1861 after the Battle of Pavón and the Corrientes revolution. Among them, Colonel Cayetano Virasoro stood out, although he was later accused of having collaborated with the Paraguayans.

In the days that followed, the Paraguayan troops continued to receive reinforcements, reaching just over 25,000 men.

For his part, Lagraña put the population of the province in a state of assembly and summoned the entire male population between 17 and 50 years of age to arms. He entrusted Colonel Desiderio Sosa with the military organization of the capital and its surroundings, and settled in the nearby town of San Roque. He managed to gather about 3,500 volunteers, many of whom had no military experience, with very little equipment.

A few weeks later, Lagraña was joined by General Nicanor Cáceres, who arrived from the Curuzú Cuatiá area and contributed some 1,500 more men, almost all veterans.

The presence on the side of the governor of Cáceres, who despite his ambiguous record, was considered to belong to the Federalist Party, cooled the federal enthusiasm for the invaders, and deprived them of all support inside the province. In any case, as the Paraguayan army began its advance south, Lagraña and his army had to withdraw, until they settled in Goya.

In the early hours of 11 July 1865, Paraguayan soldiers kidnapped from their homes Toribia de los Santos, Jacoba Plaza and their son Manuel, Encarnación Atienza, Carmen Ferré Atienza with her daughter Carmen, Victoria Bar and some of the wives of the main leaders of the Corrientes resistance.

The occupation of Corrientes was hard for its inhabitants. Wenceslao Domínguez in his historical essay La toma de Corrientes affirmed that in the occupied city:

For his part, the historian Antonio Emilio Castello affirms in his book Historia ilustrada de la provincia de Corrientes that:

Argentine reaction

The reaction of the population in the big cities was to denounce the invasion, which they saw as unjustified and treacherous. The speech that President Mitre delivered the day the news of the attack arrived in Buenos Aires included the later-reviled phrase "In 24 hours to the barracks, in fifteen days in Corrientes, in three months in Asunción!" fueled the desire for revenge. Many young men rushed to enroll in regiments created specifically for the war. The same thing happened in Rosario, and to a lesser extent in Córdoba and Santa Fe.

In contrast, in the rest of the country the reaction was very different: only the most determined supporters of the ruling party reacted publicly against the Paraguayan attack.

The reaction in the Entre Ríos Province was against the national government. Respecting his previous commitments, the governor and former president Justo José de Urquiza assembled a provincial army of 8,000 men, and moved it to the northern border of the province. The central government refrained from reprisals against the rebels. This second rebellion was harshly repressed with the help of Brazilian and Uruguayan troops.

On 1 May, the Treaty of the Triple Alliance was signed between Argentina, Uruguay and Brazil. The speed with which an agreement was reached makes many historians suspect that the treaty had been prepared in advance.

Mitre gathered the available troops in Buenos Aires, Rosario, and San Nicolás de los Arroyos, and moved a strong division north, aboard the war fleet. Meanwhile, he ordered each provincial government to provide a large contingent of infantry forces, to reinforce the troops already enlisted. Most of the cavalry troops that served in the frontier forts with the indigenous people in the south of the country were also sent north.

Paraguayan advance
In late April, the Paraguayan army slowly began to advance south, along the Paraná River. One after another, they took and plundered the cities and towns of Bella Vista, Empedrado, Santa Lucía, and Goya.

During the Paraguayan advance, the Corrientes forces interposed minor actions, resorted to guerrilla warfare and established ambush points on the roads. Battles such as Caá Catí and Naranjito consolidated the route along the rivers since the center and south of the Corrientes Province remained under the control of the Government of Corrientes, established with a new capital in San Roque. Of all the actions, the revisionists only participated in the battle of 10 May, in which Colonel Fermín Alsina, leading 800 men, was defeated by some 5,000 Paraguayans. They then had an advantage when the column coming along the Paraná river was lost nine days later in the Battle of Palmira. Colonel Manuel Vallejos realized that the invading troops did not have the capacity to confront an organized army. The battle of Palmira and the Battle of Corrientes by General Wenceslao Paunero were crucial to stopping the invading troops on the Paraná. The bastion of San Roque, from which the Governor of Corrientes exercised local power, prevented movement towards the center. The Imperial Brazilian Navy, in control of the Paraná River, prevented any assistance from the waters.

On 25 May, part of the Allied squadron appeared at Corrientes, and 725 men landed, under the command of General Wenceslao Paunero.

Charlone's battalion attacked without waiting for reinforcements to arrive, interposing themselves between the fleet and the Paraguayan defenders, preventing the use of artillery. When the other battalions landed, the Argentines advanced towards the city, fighting house to house and street by street. After a very hard fight, the Paraguayans were defeated and expelled from the city with about 400 dead; the Argentines had 62 dead, and dozens of wounded.

The Paraguayans, commanded by Major José del Rosario Martínez, withdrew towards Empedrado, reorganizing and receiving new contingents at every moment. A powerful division was also advancing from Paso de la Patria towards the capital. On the other hand, General Cáceres refused to advance in support of the reconquistadores, despite the insistence of General Manuel Hornos, who had joined his forces with some cavalry. Although this decision made it difficult for Paunero's men to resist the expected counterattack, their presence in the south of the province prevented the Paraguayan division that had occupied Goya and Santa Lucía from advancing to support the Uruguay River.

Without prior warning, and without having made any use of the advantages of his military position, Paunero re-embarked all his troops at dawn on the 27th and left. Only at the request of Governor Lagraña and General Hornos did Paunero agree to land in the extreme south of the province, in the town of Esquina.

The Paraguayan troops subjected the entire population to violent repression because they suspected them of having given aid to Paunero's troops. On 11 July they took five women hostage, wives of resistance leaders, and took them to Paraguayan territory. Four of them returned in 1869, after being treated extremely harshly, but Colonel Desiderio Sosa's wife died in captivity in Asunción. This fact reinforced the repudiation by part of the Argentine population of the Paraguayan aggression.

Battle of the Riachuelo

A Brazilian squadron was stationed a short distance from the city of Corrientes, blocking the passage of the Paraguayan war fleet down the Paraná. It was made up of nine ships, almost all battleships, and its commander was Francisco Manuel Barroso, the commodore of the squadron.

Marshal López organized a plan of attack on the Brazilian fleet, which consisted of attacking and boarding the enemy fleet by surprise and bombarding fleeing ships from shore. The Paraguayan squadron consisted of only nine steamships. The only ironclad in the fleet, commanded by Commodore Pedro Ignacio Meza, transported a total of 500 infantrymen for the boarding maneuver. They also moved a large number of chatas, wooden barges, each with a cannon on board. They passed by the enemy fleet, protected by darkness and the island that they passed behind to make themselves difficult to see, and then went up the river and attacked the enemy squadron; their orders were to sweep the deck of the enemy ships with grapeshot and musketry, and then board, saber in hand.

A battery, commanded by Major Bruguez and hidden in the forests of the ravines to the north of the mouth of the stream known as "Riachuelo", was to bombard the ships that fled from the ambush. To the south were 2,000 Paraguayan riflemen, also hidden in the woods and at the top of the ravine, with the same mission.

The operation began on the night of 10–11 June. But as they came close to the objective, the boiler of one of the ships broke, and Meza insisted on repairing it. When he finally decided to go ahead with only eight ships, it was already morning and he had missed the element of surprise. So when Meza's fleet passed the enemy squadron, there was an exchange of cannon fire between the fleets.

Next, Meza reached the outskirts of the Riachuelo and docked in the ravines. The Brazilians pursued him and closed in on him; at that moment, the coast artillery caused serious damage, and stranded one of the Brazilian ships.

But Barroso made the metal shell of his flagship, the frigate Amazonas, play in his favor, and rammed three enemy ships, sinking them. On the other hand, the Brazilian artillery disabled the wheels of two of the Paraguayan steamers. Finally, three of the Brazilian ships successively attacked several chatas, sinking them. The battle was decided and most of the Paraguayan fleet was left in ruins.

Despite the victory, which was highly publicized for months in both Brazil and Argentina, the Brazilian fleet did not take advantage of the victory. The next day it weighed anchor and set off downstream, towards the outskirts of Emedrado. However, the objective, preventing communications between Paraguay and the Atlantic Ocean, had been achieved.

The defeat prevented the Paraguayan column on the Paraná River from rendering any help to the one on the Uruguay River. On the other hand, the ephemeral reconquest of the city and the victory at Riachuelo raised the morale of the Argentine troops, as much as they depressed that of the Paraguayans and their allies from Corrientes.

Uruguay campaign

While the city of Corrientes was occupied, a garrison of 12,000 men, commanded by Lieutenant Colonel Antonio de la Cruz Estigarribia, headed east of that province to attack Brazilian territory on the Uruguay River.

President Mitre appointed General Urquiza, Governor of Entre Ríos, commander of the vanguard division, with the mission of confronting the Uruguayan column.

Lieutenant Colonel Estigarribia divided his troops and sent Major Pedro Duarte, at the head of a small advance column, to occupy the town of Santo Tomé on 5 May. Four days later, Estigarribia himself entered Santo Tomé and began crossing the Uruguay River at the head of some 6,500 men, leaving the rest divided between the Santo Tomé garrison and Duarte's advance guard of just over 3,000 soldiers.

Once in Brazilian territory, Estigarribia advanced south without encountering any resistance, successively occupying São Borja and Itaqui. In the meantime, a Paraguayan regiment was attacked and partially destroyed near São Borja, in the Battle of Mbuty. Some of the Paraguayan forces remained as a garrison in São Borja, while Duarte headed south.

It was in these circumstances that Basualdo's disbandment took place on 4 July, in which Urquiza's troops refused to fight against Paraguay, whom they considered their natural ally.

General Venancio Flores, president of Uruguay since his triumph over the Blanco Party, went to join Urquiza at the head of 2,750 men. The Brazilian forces, under the command of Lieutenant Colonel Joaquim Rodrigues Coelho Nelly, composed of 1,200 men, headed towards Concordia. There they met on 13 July, and received the order from Miter to put themselves under the orders of Flores. He was sent to meet him on the 1st Line Cavalry Regiment "San Martín" with 450 men as well as an eastern artillery squadron with 140 men. In total, Flores had 4,540 men, forces that he considered insufficient to face the two Paraguayan columns, should they meet.

Flores, Duarte and Estigarribia marched slowly to meet each other, while Paunero's 3,600 men began an accelerated march through estuaries and rivers, rapidly crossing the south of the province of Entre Ríos, to join Flores. In addition, 1,400 cavalrymen from Corrientes under the command of General Juan Madariaga marched there. Finally, Colonel Simeón Paiva, with 1,200 men, closely followed Duarte's column, with strict orders not to attack, except for detached squads.

Estigarribia rejected the opportunity to destroy all his enemies one by one, and also disobeyed López's orders, which told him to continue on to Alegrete. On 5 August he entered Uruguaiana, where he dedicated himself to reorganizing and supplying his forces, without lending any support to Duarte. General David Canabarro's Brazilian forces, too few to attack Estigarribia's 5,000-man garrison, confined themselves to stationing near the town, without being attacked by the Paraguayan chief.

On 2 August, Duarte occupied the current city of Paso de los Libres. A week later, a small encounter between his outposts and Corrientes troops caused 20 Paraguayan casualties.

Battle of Yatay

Given the numerical superiority of the enemy, Duarte asked Estigarribia for help, but he refused. On 13 August, without Duarte being able to prevent the enemy attacks, Paunero and Paiva joined Flores' army, gathering a total of about 12,000 men of 5,550 infantry, 5,000 cavalry and 32 artillery pieces. Duarte had just over a quarter of that — a force of 1,980 infantry and 1,020 cavalry, with no artillery.

Duarte left Paso de los Libres and took up position in the ravines of the Yatay stream, very close to the town. His defensive position was good, especially considering that he had no artillery. But, because he left the creek behind him, in the event of a defeat, which Duarte himself considered very likely, a retreat would not be possible.

The battle began at ten o'clock on the morning of 17 August, with a hasty attack by Palleja's infantry division; Duarte took advantage of the error and counterattacked with almost all the cavalry, causing hundreds of casualties and forcing him to fall back. The artillery only managed to fire 50 shots, before having to cease fire, so as not to massacre Palleja's division, which had crossed the line of fire.

Ignacio Segovia's cavalry division attacked the Paraguayan cavalry, supported by the Orientals. For more than two hours, the battle was exclusively cavalry.

When the Allied infantry finally got into action, they overwhelmed the Paraguayan positions. However, the Paraguayans held out stubbornly for another hour. Duarte attempted a desperate cavalry charge, but his horse was killed and he was taken prisoner by Paunero. Later, he saved the life of the Paraguayan chief, whom Flores intended to have executed. Some infantrymen continued to resist north of the Yatay stream, but were defeated by Juan Madariaga's cavalry from Corrientes.

The Paraguayans had 1,500 dead and 1,600 taken prisoner. Only about a hundred men survived by swimming across the Uruguay and joining the forces of Estigarribia.

Among the prisoners, Flores found several dozen Uruguayan soldiers, supporters of the Blanco Party who had taken refuge in Paraguay, and Federalist Argentines, who did not recognize the national authority of Mitre. Forgetting the help he had obtained from Brazil, and Mitre's rebellion against the Argentine Confederation, Flores ordered their execution as traitors to the country.

Many Paraguayan soldiers were forced to take up arms against their own country, replacing the losses in the Allied divisions, especially the eastern ones.

Siege of Uruguaiana

On 16 July, the Brazilian Army reached the border of Rio Grande do Sul and laid siege to the city of Uruguaiana. The troops received reinforcements and sent at least three orders to surrender to Estigarribia. On 11 September, Emperor Pedro II of Brazil arrived. Presidents Bartolomé Mitre and Venancio Flores were already present as well as various Brazilian military chiefs, such as the Marquis of Tamandaré and Lieutenant General Manuel Marques de Sousa, baron and later Count of Porto Alegre. At that time, the allied forces of the siege had 17,346 combatants, of whom 12,393 were Brazilian, 3,802 Argentines, and 1,220 Uruguayans, with 54 guns. The surrender took place on 16 September, when Estigarribia reached an agreement on the required conditions.

After a serious conflict of authority between the heads of the Alliance, the Emperor himself ordered his officers to place themselves in everything under the orders of Mitre, as he was appointed commander-in-chief of the Allied armies.

The head of the Paraguayan division of the Allied army wrote to Estigarribia, rejecting the besieged chief's charge of treason, and accusing López of betraying his country by carrying out an oppressive policy towards his people. Estigarribia's response to this letter revealed that not all of his officers agreed to fight to the death, as he had proclaimed.

On 11 September, with authorization from the besieging forces, Estigarribia sent almost the entire civilian population to the Allied camp; his objective was not solely humanitarian, since the civilian population consumed food, a problem of crucial importance in any besieged population.

After a series of exchanges of cannonades and rifle shots, on 13 September, Mitre organized a general assault on the square. The besieged troops died from disease, and a massive desertion spread, encouraged by discussions between their leaders about whether or not they should resist until the end, reducing the defenders to just over 5,500 men.

On 18 September, the Marques de Sousa issued an ultimatum, announcing that he would begin the assault in two hours. Estigarribia replied that he would hand over the plaza, in exchange for the superior officers being allowed to retreat to anywhere, even to Paraguay. He also demanded that the Oriental soldiers and officers in his ranks not be handed over to Flores, since he feared that Flores would execute them.

Despite his ultimatum, the Paraguayan soldiers were taken prisoner. Many of them were killed during the operation, and many others, perhaps 800 to 1,000, were taken prisoner by Brazilian cavalry chiefs and sold into slavery. Those who remained in the hands of the Argentine and Uruguayan officers hadn't had any better luck, as they were forced to integrate a "Paraguayan division" of the Allied army or be directly incorporated into the infantry forces of those countries.

In total, there were 5,574 Paraguayan prisoners: 59 officers, 3,860 infantrymen, 1,390 cavalrymen, 115 artillerymen, and 150 auxiliaries.

Paraguayan withdrawal
In mid-June, Robles ordered his troops to abandon the towns in the south of the province, concentrating his forces in the provincial capital. For a time he managed to keep some towns, within a radius of no more than 150 km from the capital, while some cavalry roamed the center of the province.

On 12 August, another naval encounter took place, when the Brazilian fleet retreated even further south, in the direction of Goya. A battery installed on the coast, in the place known as "Paso de Cuevas" near Bella Vista, bombarded the squadron as it passed. In the so-called Battle of Paso de Cuevas, thanks to their ship classes, since they passed with the entire crew in the holds and at full steam, the Brazilian ships did not suffer major damage, although they did have 21 dead and 38 wounded, almost all of them sailors. On the other hand, the only ship of the Argentine Navy, the Guardia Nacional, commanded by Luis Py, but having on board the commander of the Navy, José Murature, stopped in front of the battery and engaged in an artillery duel, which ended in damage to the ship, three dead and 12 wounded. Two out of the three soldiers killed by the artillery strikes were young officers: one was a son of Captain Py and the other a son of former Governor Pedro Ferré of Corrientes.

Various commanders of the Allied troops attempted to negotiate with Robles and even induce him to switch sides. As a result, he was replaced by General Francisco Isidoro Resquín on the orders of President López. At the beginning of the following year, Robles would be subjected to a summary trial and executed for his alleged betrayal.

The Paraguayan occupation of Corrientes was now useless, as the Argentine army, reinforced by large Brazilian and Uruguayan contingents, advanced in search of the enemy towards the north. On the other hand, many of the Paraguayan forces were withdrawn towards Paraguayan territory, in anticipation of an Alliance invasion.

At the end of June, and again at the end of July, General Hornos' troops defeated some cavalry groups in the marshes in the center of the province, identified as Argentines, most of them from Corrientes, and with the Federalist Party.

On 21 September, Hornos defeated a division of 810 collaborators from Corrientes under the command of the Lobera brothers from the town of Naranjitos.

Simultaneously, an Allied detachment under the command of General Gregorio Castro advanced along the coast of Uruguay. Passing La Cruz, the vanguard, under the command of Colonel Fernández Reguera, discovered near Santo Tomé an enemy division with three artillery batteries, leading a gigantic herd of 30,000 cattle from Corrientes to their country. Reguera defeated the Paraguayans and advanced to Candelaria, liberating the territory of Alto Paraná.

On 3 October, López ordered Resquín to have the Southern Division evacuate Argentine territory through Paso de la Patria. When the clash between the Argentine forces was already imminent on 22 October, General Resquín evacuated Corrientes by river and by land, and a few days later also withdrew from the last town under their occupation, San Cosimo.

The withdrawal of the Paraguayan forces was accompanied by systematic looting. They looted all the ranches on the Paraná coast, leaving them perfectly clean and setting some of them on fire. Goya suffered especially as the entire commerce of the town suffered unspeakable looting as several steamers on three trips took the loot to Asunción. The national and provincial public offices were found in pieces with their files stolen. The iron materials for the construction of the church were stolen, and a door of the chapel was axed. Farms didn't have any livestock and were abandoned by their owners. The looting was perpetrated by the Paraguayans and the Federalist José F. Cáceres, who took his cruelty to the extreme of persecuting the families that had taken refuge in the Chaco. The fates of the other cities weren't any better. General Nicanor Cáceres already reported in August that:

The provincial capital was occupied by troops of Nicanor Cáceres on the 28th of the same month, and on November 3 the provincial government was reinstalled. That same day, Resquín's 27,000 men completed the passage of the Paraná River to their own country without being hampered by the Brazilians, even taking 100,000 head of cattle across from Corrientes, but most of these died near Itapirú due to the lack of adequate pasture.

On 25 December, a new governor, Evaristo López, was elected by a legislature made up mostly of members of the Federal Party. The Federalist victory was due to the control over most of the provincial territory exercised by General Cáceres, of whom López was a friend and partner. Many collaborators with the Paraguayan invasion who had been arrested and risked being executed for treason, were released thanks to the Federalist government of Corrientes while the others fled to Paraguay. Several of them, among them two of the members of the triumvirate, were executed years later by order of Francisco Solano López.

At the end of the year, the Allied army, gathered in the Ensenadas or Ensenaditas camp, a few kilometers north of Corrientes, near the current town of Paso de la Patria, reached 50,000 men. Just then, the Brazilian fleet took up positions upstream of the confluence of the Paraná and Paraguay rivers.

Battle of Pehuajó

After the withdrawal of the Paraguayan army, the defense of Paraguay focused on two positions. On one side,  was on the right bank of the Paraná River, defended by a large number of cannons.

For their part, the Alliance troops concentrated from December to early April of the following year in the Ensenada camp, north of the city of Corrientes. The meeting of the troops was especially complex since almost all the contingents sent from the provinces of the Argentine interior revolted against being sent to war. For its part, the powerful entrerriana (from Entre Rios) division of 6,000 men, revolted again on 6 November, in the so-called Disbandment of Toledo. Therefore, the Entre Ríos Province was only garrisoned by 400 men, who could not desert due to lack of horses, and whom Urquiza himself had to threaten with execution to force them to embark.

The Paraguayan troops didn't just wait for their enemies to advance. They carried out continuous attacks on the coast of Corrientes. They crossed the Paraná River in boats or canoes, without the Brazilians, who could almost see the maneuver, being able to do anything to prevent it. Upon reaching land, cavalry corps from the divisions of Cáceres or Hornos, who were encamped northeast of Ensenaditas, usually came out to confront them. These operations did not come to much except for some cattle theft, at the cost of some deaths; the only positive military effect was discouragement among the Corrientes soldiers, which would not last long.

Finally, on 30 January, Mitre decided to punish the daring Paraguayans, and sent the Buenos Aires division, commanded by General Emilio Conesa, with almost 1,600 men, to meet them. Almost all of them were gauchos from Buenos Aires Province, much more suitable for cavalry than for the infantry to which they were assigned.

The landing party had about 200 men, but on the Paraguayan side there were almost 1,000 more soldiers, who had to cross the next day. After advancing a few kilometers, they reached the Arroyo Pehuajó, where General Conesa was waiting in ambush; before attacking his opponents, he addressed his troops, who burst into loud cheers, betraying their presence to the Paraguayans.

The Paraguayan leader, Lieutenant Celestino Prieto, began to retreat, which Conesa tried to prevent with a massive and direct charge. But the Paraguayans barricaded themselves in the woods behind the stream and took up a defensive position, from which they fired on the Argentine soldiers, who had nowhere to seek shelter. The Paraguayans received around 900 reinforcements, with whom they caused almost 900 casualties in the Argentine forces versus 170 Paraguayans. Just as day fell, General Mitre, who could hear the volleys from his camp, ordered Conesa's troops to withdraw. At nightfall the Paraguayans re-embarked and withdrew at their own expense.

Despite having obtained a victory, the Paraguayan troops didn't repeat this type of action.

The last battle before the invasion of Paraguay occurred on 10 April on the island in front of Fort Itapirú, when a Brazilian division took up positions to bombard the fort. The Paraguayans could've limited themselves to exchanging cannon shots, in which they would have had a wide advantage, as they had cover within the walls, while the Brazilians had to defend themselves on a sandy island, with no possible cover. However, the Paraguayans tried to remove their enemy with infantry, and were seriously defeated in their attempt.

Aftermath

On 5 April 1866, the Allied forces captured , thus starting the third phase of the war, the Humaitá campaign. The northern front was also practically abandoned, and the northeast section was easily occupied by Brazil, as the Paraguayan troops had to concentrate on the south.

Estigarribia's army was completely lost and Robles's returned with only 14,000 healthy but exhausted soldiers and 5,000 sick. According to George Thompson, by the end of 1865, the Paraguayans had already lost 52,000 men, 30,000 of them on other fronts or due to illness, and 10,000 were sick. During 1864, the Paraguayan army tripled from its original 20,000 troops thanks to massive levies, installing 10,000 in Humaitá, against Argentina, and 15,000 in Villa Encarnación, against Brazil.

The Corrientes campaign had not only been a failure, but led to the formation of the Triple Alliance. It possibly might have formed anyway, as various historians claim, but the invasion precipitated events long before the Paraguayan army was minimally prepared for a war against three countries.

On the other hand, any possible help that could have been obtained from the Argentine Federalists was nullified by Mitre's clever journalistic campaign to present the Paraguayan invasion as a cunning attack with no prior warning. Ultimately, the rebellions of the Federalists, both those of 1865 and the larger Colorados Revolution of 1866, only caused problems for the Argentine Army, and they did not continue to serve in Paraguay at all.

See also
Siege of Paysandú

References

Bibliography
 Zenequelli, Lilia, Crónica de una guerra, La Triple Alianza. Ed. Dunken, Bs. As., 1997. 
 Ruiz Moreno, Isidoro J., Campañas militares argentinas, Tomo IV, Ed. Emecé, Bs. As., 2008. 
 Rosa, José María, La guerra del Paraguay y las montoneras argentinas, Ed. Hyspamérica, 1986. 
 Castello, Antonio Emilio, Historia de Corrientes, Ed. Plus Ultra, Bs. As., 1991. .
 Corrêa Martins, Francisco José (2014). "El empleo de los mitaí y mitá en el ejército paraguayo durante la Guerra de la Triple Alianza (1864-1870)". En Juan Manuel Casal & Thomas L. Whigham. Paraguay: Investigaciones de historia social y política: Actas de las III Jornadas Internacionales de Historia del Paraguay en la Universidad de Montevideo. Asunción: Editorial Tiempo de Historia & Universidad de Montevideo, pp. 181–192. .
 Giorgio, Dante A., Yatay, la primera sangre, Revista Todo es Historia, Nro. 445, Bs. As., 2004.
 Tissera, Ramón, Riachuelo, la batalla que cerró a Solano López la ruta al océano, Revista Todo es Historia, número 46, Bs. As., 1971.

Conflicts in 1865
Conflicts in 1866
Battles of the Paraguayan War
Battles involving Brazil
Battles involving Argentina
Battles involving Uruguay
Battles involving Paraguay
1865 in Argentina
1866 in Argentina
April 1865 events
May 1865 events
June 1865 events
July 1865 events
August 1865 events
September 1865 events
October 1865 events
November 1865 events
December 1865 events
January 1866 events
History of Corrientes Province
History of Rio Grande do Sul